The 2009 Australian motorcycle Grand Prix was the fifteenth round of the 2009 Grand Prix motorcycle racing season. It took place on the weekend of 16–18 October 2009 at the Phillip Island Grand Prix Circuit. Ducati rider Casey Stoner won the grand prix, in his home race. Championship leader Valentino Rossi finished second, further increasing his championship lead over rival Jorge Lorenzo, who crashed out and failed to score any points. This also marked the final Grand Prix win in the career of Marco Simoncelli before his death 2 years later on 23 October 2011 at the 2011 Malaysian motorcycle Grand Prix after suffering a fatal crash in Race.

MotoGP classification

250 cc classification
The race, scheduled to be run for 25 laps, was stopped after 18 full laps due to Roberto Locatelli having an accident and did not restart as two-thirds of the race distance had been completed.

125 cc classification

Notes

Championship standings after the race (MotoGP)
Below are the standings for the top five riders and constructors after round fifteen has concluded.

Riders' Championship standings

Constructors' Championship standings

 Note: Only the top five positions are included for both sets of standings.

References

Australian motorcycle Grand Prix
Australian
Motorcycle
Motorsport at Phillip Island
October 2009 sports events in Australia